Boulders Beach is a sheltered beach made up of inlets between granite boulders, from which the name originated. It is located on the Cape Peninsula, in Simon's Town, a suburb of Cape Town in the Western Cape province of South Africa. It is also commonly known as Boulders Bay. It is a popular tourist spot because of a colony of African penguins which settled there in 1982. Boulders Beach forms part of the Table Mountain National Park.

These African penguins are only found on the coastlines of Southern Africa (South Africa & Namibia). These penguins are currently on the verge of extinction. As a result, the penguins are under the protection of the Cape Nature Conservation.

Although set in a residential area, it is one of the few sites where this vulnerable bird (Spheniscus demersus) can be observed at close range, wandering freely in a protected natural environment. From just two breeding pairs in 1982, the penguin colony has grown to about 3000 birds in recent years. This is partly due to the prohibition of commercial pelagic trawling in False Bay, which has increased the supply of sardines and anchovies, which form part of the penguins' diet. as well as the help from former SANDF naval officer, Van the Penguin Man 

Bordered mainly by indigenous bush above the high-water mark on the one side, and the clear water of False Bay on the other, the area comprises several small sheltered bays, partially enclosed by granite boulders that are 540 million years old.

The most popular recreational spot is Boulders Beach, but the penguins are best viewed from Foxy Beach, where newly constructed boardwalks take visitors to within a few metres of the birds. It is also a famous swimming beach, although people are restricted to beaches adjacent to the penguin colony.

Gallery

References

External links

Get to know the African Penguins at Boulders Beach  from 

Beaches of South Africa
Geography of Cape Town
Tourist attractions in Cape Town
Table Mountain National Park